Malcolm Boyd McNab is a trumpeter and player of other brass instruments, and a Los Angeles-based session musician who has performed on nearly 2000 film and television soundtracks.

Education
Raised in the San Gabriel Valley, McNab began studying the trumpet at the age of nine, with his father as his first teacher. Later, he studied with Pasadena maestro Walter Laursen, and performed with the Pasadena Symphony at the age of fourteen while still attending Mark Keppel High School in Alhambra.

In 1958 at the age of 15, McNab began playing with the Young Musicians Foundation Debut Orchestra under conductors Dr. Miklos Rosza, Lawrence Foster, Gerhard Samuel and Henry Lewis. He also became the Principal Trumpet and librarian for the Pasadena Symphony under Dr. Richard Lert.
 
It was at that time that McNab began his studies with James Stamp, leading him to a most valuable path which he has followed for the past 54 years.

After touring with the San Francisco Ballet and service in the U.S. Army, playing with the West Point band, he studied privately in New York City with John Ware and William Vacchiano.

Professional career
On returning to Southern California, McNab began working as a session musician as well as playing live solo performances with various regional orchestras. Since 1970, he has recorded classical music with such organizations as the Los Angeles Philharmonic Orchestra, the Los Angeles Chamber Orchestra, and the New York City Opera.

His recording credits in popular music include albums with Dionne Warwick, Peggy Lee, Chicago, and The Carpenters, as well as less well-known artists such as Van Dyke Parks. He has also appeared on albums by Frank Zappa, including; Joe's Garage, Studio Tan, Imaginary Diseases and The Grand Wazoo (credited as Malcolm McNabb).

He has performed on albums by jazz musicians such as Les McCann, and from 1975 until its demise in 1988, McNab played trumpet with the experimental session group, the Abnuceals Emuukha Electric Symphony Orchestra.

Films and television
It is the soundtracks of popular films and television shows which have made McNab's playing familiar to hundreds of millions of people who have never heard his name. However, in November 2006, McNab released his first solo album titled Exquisite. He has also given solo performances on the soundtracks of such television shows as Star Trek: Deep Space Nine, Dr. Quinn, Medicine Woman,  and Highway to Heaven, and has been featured as a solo artist on the soundtracks of numerous films, including E.T. the Extra-Terrestrial, Jaws, Scrooged, Cocoon: The Return, Coming to America, Indiana Jones, Star Trek, The Package, The Karate Kid Part III, The Little Mermaid, Field of Dreams, Glory, The War of the Roses, Always, Hard to Kill, Nightbreed, Pretty Woman, Hoffa, The Edge, Soldier, Dick Tracy, Home Alone, Edward Scissorhands, The Bonfire of the Vanities, Misery, Hook, Beauty and the Beast, Final Analysis, The Rocketeer, Sleepwalkers, Robin Hood: Prince of Thieves, The Chronicles of Narnia: The Lion, the Witch and the Wardrobe, Jurassic Park, Wyatt Earp, Outbreak, First Knight, Small Soldiers, Far and Away, Dinosaur, The Nightmare Before Christmas, Batman Returns, Batman Forever, Peter Pan, Atlantis: The Lost Empire,  National Treasure,  Treasure Planet, The Simpsons Movie, Spaceballs,  Aliens vs. Predator: Requiem, Timeline, Spider-Man, Under Siege 2: Dark Territory, Meet the Robinsons, The Patriot, Waterworld, Serenity, The Net, My Fellow Americans, Space Jam, Toy Story, James and the Giant Peach,  A Bug's Life, Monsters, Inc., The First Wives Club, Mars Attacks!, 101 Dalmatians, Dante's Peak, Liar Liar, Cats & Dogs, Mulan, The Matrix, Planet of the Apes, War of the Worlds, Godzilla, Starship Troopers, The Polar Express, The Wild, The Lost World, The Shadow, Men in Black, Leatherheads, Minority Report, The Pursuit of Happyness, Speed 2: Cruise Control, Batman & Robin, My Best Friend's Wedding, Hercules, Mission: Impossible, Van Helsing, Firewall, Signs, Dreamcatcher, Meet Dave, Monster House,  The Sixth Sense, The Sum of All Fears, Transformers, Pirates of the Caribbean, Hulk, G.I. Joe: The Rise of Cobra, A Christmas Carol, Lady in the Water, The Happening and WALL-E.

His solo trumpet can be heard on such soundtracks as: Dances with Wolves, The Gambler, Avalon, Crimson Tide, City Hall, In Country, Twister, Executive Decision, Independence Day, Con Air, Rudy, The Last Castle, Air Force One, The Postman, Cars, I Am Legend, U.S. Marshals, The Interpreter, Renaissance Man, Toys, Darkman, Maverick, Night at the Museum, L.A. Confidential and The Rock.

McNab has also found time to teach music at various schools, including UCLA, Pomona College, and branches of the California State University. He has twice been the recipient of the Most Valuable Player Award of the National Academy of Recording Arts and Sciences.

External links
 
 
 
 Exquisite

American session musicians
American trumpeters
People from Alhambra, California
Living people
1943 births
Pomona College faculty